John Winterdyk (born 1954) is a Canadian criminology professor at Mount Royal University in Calgary, Alberta. He is the university's Centre for Criminology and Justice Research chair. 

He has spent much time in Sub-Saharan Africa studying local beliefs about violence and honour. He was the first person to receive a PhD in Criminology from the School of Criminology at Simon Fraser University. He later served as visiting scholar to the Max Planck Society in Freiburg im Breisgau, Germany. In 2010, Winterdyk conducted a study with fellow Mount Royal University professor Kelly Sundberg as well as with scholars from Europe and the United States, and the study concluded that Canada is not doing as well as other democratic countries in the Western world in preparing its law enforcement officers to address the issue of people smuggling. Winterdyk wrote a book called Human Trafficking: Exploring the International Nature, Concerns, and Complexities and signed copies of the book at an event at Mount Royal University on February 16, 2012, which also included a speech by Yvon Dandurand on the subject of human trafficking, and a reading of the play She Has a Name by Andrew Kooman. 

In June 2014, one of Winterdyk's colleagues made a complaint about Winterdyk to a court judge, which prompted the Crown to charge Winterdyk with forcible confinement. After a closed-door hearing that June at which both Winterdyk and the complainant were in attendance, the Crown decided to drop the case because there did not seem to be a reasonable chance that Winterdyck would be convicted.

Selected works

References 

Living people
1953 births
Canadian criminologists
Academic staff of Mount Royal University
Simon Fraser University alumni